Dale Nally  is a Canadian politician who was elected in the 2019 Alberta general election to the Legislative Assembly of Alberta representing the electoral district of Morinville-St. Albert as a member of the United Conservative Party. He was sworn in as Alberta's first ever Associate Minister of Natural Gas on April 30, 2019.

Nally brings with him decades of private sector experience managing and leading business units that generate between $50 million and $80 million in revenue. He holds a master's degree in Education from Athabasca University.

Nally's volunteer involvement includes various roles with the St. Albert Minor Hockey Association and Co-Chair for Diversity Edmonton, a volunteer organization that worked with businesses to promote the hiring of people with disabilities.

References

United Conservative Party MLAs
Living people
People from St. Albert, Alberta
21st-century Canadian politicians
Year of birth missing (living people)
Members of the Executive Council of Alberta